A chipolata is a type of fresh sausage, likely created in France. Sausages by that name appear in the 1903 edition of Escoffier's . Chipolatas are often prepared as a relatively thin and short sausage.

Chipolatas are typically made from coarse-ground pork seasoned with salt and pepper together with herbs and spices—according to the particular recipe—such as sage, thyme, pimento, or nutmeg.
 The word is French and probably derives from the Italian , which essentially means "made with onions" and according to some sources may have referred to an onion stew with sausages.

Chipolatas are common in the United Kingdom. They frequently appear as part of a Christmas dinner wrapped in streaky bacon as pigs in blankets.

A  consists of onions, chipolata sausages, chestnuts, salt pork, and sometimes carrots in a demiglace or Madeira sauce.

In Switzerland, the Italian spelling  (plural: cipollate) is more prevalent. The sausage also usually contains veal and milk, in addition to pork.  are fried or grilled and often served to children.  taste and look like a miniature version of the St. Galler Bratwurst.

See also
 List of sausages

References

French sausages
British sausages
Fresh sausages